Michael J. Lenox (born February 23, 1971) is an American strategist and professor of business administration at the Darden School of the University of Virginia, particularly known for his work on business strategy, technology strategy, corporate sustainability and industry self-regulation. Lenox was also a visiting professor at Oxford University, Harvard University and Stanford University. He is a contributor at Forbes magazine.

Biography 
Born in Morrisville, Pennsylvania, son to James P. Lenox and Virginia Lynn Lenox. Michael received a B.S. in systems engineering from University of Virginia in 1993, a M.S. in Systems Engineering  from University of Virginia in 1994  and a Ph.D. in Technology Management and Policy from Massachusetts Institute of Technology (MIT) in 1999.

He taught previously at New York University (NYU) Stern School of Business  and at Duke University Fuqua School of Business, and is currently the Tayloe Murphy Professor of Business at the Darden School of Business, University of Virginia and has served as the school's Senior Associate Dean and Chief Strategy Officer since 2016.

Work 
Lenox is known for his work at the intersection of business strategy, technology and innovation, and public policy.[3] His most recent book is “Can Business Save the Earth? Innovating our Way to Sustainability”, co-authored with Aaron Chatterji and published by Stanford University Press.  From 2008 to 2016, he led the Batten Institute, a research center established to develop thought leadership in the fields of entrepreneurship and corporate innovation. Michael was a founder and first president of the multiple-university Alliance for Research on Corporate Sustainability (ARCS), a professional society of scholars from all disciplines studying the interface between business and sustainability. He teaches and serves as a course head for the first year "Strategy" core course of the MBA Program at Darden.

Business strategy 

Professor Lenox has been teaching and studying strategy for over 20 years. Besides teaching both MBAs and executive MBAs from Fuqua School of Business and from Darden School of Business, Lenox is one of the faculty pioneers to teach business strategy in a MOOC (Massive Online Open Course). His most popular course, Foundations of Business Strategy, explores the theory and frameworks that provide the foundations of a successful business strategy. He gave this course in different platforms such as Udemy and Coursera. His most recent online course is Digital Transformation in partnership with BCG Consulting and available on Coursera.  He has had more than a half-million students in his online courses.[7]

His most recent work in business strategy is available in his book The Strategist's Toolkit, co-authored with his colleague Jared D. Harris. The book's main goal is to provide a conceptual framework and tools to analyze the strategy of an organization, with the intent to teach the strategist's work.

Recognitions 

Professor Lenox was recognized, in 2009, as a Faculty Pioneer by the Aspen Institute for his work on business and sustainability.  He was recognized as the top strategy professor under 40 by the Strategic Management Society in 2009. In 2011, he was named one of the top 40 business professors under 40 by Poets & Quants.

References

External links

 Michael Lenox instructor webpage at Coursera
 Michael Lenox personal webpage

1971 births
New York University faculty
Living people
University of Virginia School of Engineering and Applied Science alumni
University of Virginia faculty
Massachusetts Institute of Technology alumni